Udo Steiner (born September 16, 1939 in Bayreuth) was a justice of the Federal Constitutional Court of Germany from 1995 to 2007.

He grew up in Franconia, and went on to study law in Erlangen, Saarbrücken and Cologne. In 1965, he earned a doctorate with the thesis Verfassunggebung und verfassunggebende Gewalt des Volkes. Subsequently, he earned his Habilitation in 1972, with the thesis Öffentliche Verwaltung durch Private.

In 1973, Steiner was appointed as Professor of Public Law at the University of Erlangen, and subsequently served as Professor at the universities of Göttingen, Bielefeld and Regensburg. He was Dean of the Faculty of Law at the University of Bielefeld from 1976 to 1977, and in Regensburg from 1988 to 1990. Between 1976 and 1979, he also served as a Judge at the Oberverwaltungsgericht.

He was appointed a Judge at the Federal Constitutional Court in October 1995, and still lectures at the University of Regensburg. He was retired as a Judge upon turning 68 in 2007, and was succeeded by Ferdinand Kirchhof.

In 2008, he was appointed as the Ombudsman of Deutsche Bahn for victims of railway accidents.

Steiner married in 1967 and has four children.

Honours 
 2007: Großes Verdienstkreuz mit Stern und Schulterband
 2008: Bayerischer Verdienstorden

References

External links 
 

Jurists from Bavaria
Justices of the Federal Constitutional Court
Academic staff of the University of Regensburg
Grand Crosses with Star and Sash of the Order of Merit of the Federal Republic of Germany
1939 births
Living people
People from Bayreuth